City of Sheffield Water Polo Club is a water polo club located in Sheffield, England. It has been granted “Beacon” club status by the Amateur Swimming Association. This makes Sheffield one of only 3 water polo clubs in the country to be awarded this accolade. Incidentally Sheffield’s Swimming and Diving clubs have also been awarded this status.

History
The city of Sheffield is one of the leading water polo clubs in Great Britain – the women’s A team were British champions for 3 years running and league one winners for 5 years running. The men’s team were promoted to the second division of the national league 2007/08, winning the division in 2010/11 and the women's B team were promoted to the second division in the 2009/10 season. Sheffield youth girls '91's ASA National Water Polo Championships 2008 runners up.

References

External links
[sheffieldwaterpolo.moonfruit.com], history  info
, Club info

Sport in Sheffield
Water polo in England
Water polo clubs in the United Kingdom